Douglas Hewitt Hacking, 1st Baron Hacking  (4 August 1884 – 29 July 1950) was a British Conservative politician.

Early life and military career
Educated at Giggleswick School and Manchester University, he was commissioned in the East Lancashire Regiment in August 1914 and served two years in France during World War I. He was mentioned in despatches and was appointed to the Order of the British Empire as an Officer (OBE) in the 1919 New Year Honours. In World War II, from 1940 to 1944, he served with the 5th Battalion Surrey Home Guard.

Political career
Hacking was elected as Unionist Member of Parliament (MP) for the Chorley Division of Lancashire in December 1918 and sat for the constituency until June 1945.

He was Parliamentary Private Secretary to Sir James Craig at the Ministry of Pensions in 1920 and at the Admiralty from 1920 to 1921; then to Sir Laming Worthington-Evans as Secretary of State for War from 1921 to 1922.
He was Vice-Chamberlain of the Household from 1922 to 1924 and from November 1924 to December 1925; Conservative Whip, 1922–1925.

He held junior ministerial office as Parliamentary Under-Secretary of State for the Home Department, and Representative of the Office of Works in the House of Commons from 1925 to 1927; as Secretary for Overseas Trade, Parliamentary Secretary to the Board of Trade, and Parliamentary Under-Secretary of State for Foreign Affairs, 1927–1929; as Parliamentary Under-Secretary of State for the Home Department, 1933–1934; as Financial Secretary to the War Office, 1934–1935; and as Parliamentary Under-Secretary of State for Dominion Affairs, 1935–1936.

He appointed to be a Justice of the Peace and Deputy Lieutenant for the County of Surrey in 1940. He was awarded the Freedom of the Borough of Chorley on 30 November 1946.

He was created a Baronet, of Altham in the County Palatine of Lancaster in the 1938 Birthday Honours, was sworn of the Privy Council in the 1929 Dissolution Honours and was raised to the peerage as Baron Hacking, of Chorley in the County Palatine of Lancaster in the 1945 Dissolution Honours.

Other positions held
He was a member of Empire Parliamentary Delegation to South Africa, 1924; chairman of Home Office Committee on Compensation for Silicosis, 1926; chairman of Home Office Committee on Taxicabs (Conditions of Licensing, etc.), 1927; chairman of Committee on redistribution of Royal Ordnance Factories, 1934; chancellor of the Primrose League, 1931; vice-chairman, National Union of Conservative and Unionist Associations, 1930–1932; government delegate to League of Nations, Geneva, 1933; chairman Conservative Party Organisation, 1936–1942; member General Medical Council, 1932–1947.

Arms

References

External links 

1884 births
1950 deaths
British Home Guard soldiers
Hacking, Douglas
Alumni of the University of Manchester
Deputy Lieutenants of Surrey
East Lancashire Regiment officers
English justices of the peace
British Army personnel of World War I
Members of the Privy Council of the United Kingdom
Officers of the Order of the British Empire
People educated at Giggleswick School
Hacking, Douglas
Hacking, Douglas
Hacking, Douglas
Hacking, Douglas
Hacking, Douglas
Hacking, Douglas
Hacking, Douglas
UK MPs who were granted peerages
Chairmen of the Conservative Party (UK)
Barons created by George VI
1